Judge Pope may refer to:

Nathaniel Pope (1784–1850), judge for the United States District Court for the District of Illinois
Walter Lyndon Pope (1889–1969), judge of the United States Court of Appeals for the Ninth Circuit
William Hayes Pope (1870–1916), judge of the United States District Court for the District of New Mexico

See also
Justice Pope (disambiguation)